Jaru Biological Reserve is a biological reserve in the state of Rondônia, Brazil.
It is part of the Southern Amazon Conservation Corridor.

Location

The conservation unit was originally created in 1961 as the Jaru Forest Reserve, then replaced in 1984 by the Jaru Biological Reserve.
It is administered by the Chico Mendes Institute for Biodiversity Conservation.
It is located in the municipalities of Vale do Anari, Machadinho d'Oeste and Ji-Paraná in the state of Rondônia.
The reserve would be in the proposed South Amazon Ecotones Ecological Corridor.

The reserve is in the middle Ji-Paraná River basin, in the sub-basin of the Tarumã stream.
It lies between the Sierra do Moquém to the north and the Sierra da Providência to the south, south east and east.
A survey recorded 168 species of fish, the probable presence of 189 species of amphibians and reptiles, 538 species of birds and over 73 species of mammals.

Conservation

The Biological Reserve is a "strict nature reserve" under IUCN protected area category Ia.
The purpose is to conserve biota and other natural attributes without human interference.
It is located in the Madeira Tapajós interfluvial, one of the less well known regions of Brazil and one of great importance in conserving the Amazon biome. It is part of the Southern Amazon Conservation Corridor, which extends from the state of Tocantins to the state of Rondinia. These protected areas, as well as conserving biodiversity of the Amazon and the Cerrado contact areas, have proved the most effective as a barrier against deforestation.
The conservation unit is supported by the Amazon Region Protected Areas Program.

Protected species are oncilla (Leopardus tigrinus), jaguar (Panthera onca) and giant otter (Pteronura brasiliensis).

References

Sources

1961 establishments in Brazil
Biological reserves of Brazil
Protected areas of Rondônia
Protected areas established in 1961